San Pedro is a town and  municipality located in the Department of Valle del Cauca, Colombia. Founded by Jorge de Herrera y Gaitán in 1797, its first inhabitants were Indians called Chancos, who fought against the forces sent by Belarcarzal until well into the early eighteen hundreds. Tulua Amerindians, who practiced ritual canibalism. San Pedro became famous for their fine musicians and composers. Like any other South American town, San Pedro became Catholic from the very beginning. Nowadays, it is famous also for its billiard cues. Around June 28, which is their saint's celebration, Sanpedrenos celebrate also their annual fair, that usually invites local and foreign musical bands. There is a local pageant to elect their annual Senorita San Pedro.

References

Municipalities of Valle del Cauca Department
Populated places established in 1797